COMM, Comm or comm may also refer to:

Comm may also refer to:

 comm, the Unix command
 "Comm.", the standard botanical abbreviation for scientist Philibert Commerson
 "comm.", an abbreviation for commentary
 COMM (The Tangent album)
 ComM, abbreviation used to signify the Comendador/Comendadeira grade of the Portuguese Order of Merit
 comm, shorthand for Communication

See also
 Com (disambiguation)